Emmett Smith "Cyclone" Davis (December 12, 1918 – November 3, 2015) was a career officer and pilot in the United States Air Force, retiring as a colonel. He was an American and United States Army Air Forces fighter pilot in the Pacific of World War II and a jet fighter pilot with the Air Force in the Korean War.

Early years
Davis was born December 12, 1918 in Roosevelt, Utah. He was the fifth of eight children. His family was poor and lived in a tent. His father had been in an infantry in Wyoming and had served with Teddy Roosevelt in the Rough Riders in the Spanish–American War.

When Davis was in the 3rd grade his family moved to Duchesne, Utah. His fourth grade teacher's husband had purchased an old Curtis Jenny mail plane. Emmett later said, "I used to go up and watch him fly that old airplane, and I guess that was really when I got struck with being an aviator". After his 7th grade year his family moved to Salt Lake City, Utah. There he graduated from East High School. He later attended the University of Utah. In 1939, his family again moved, this time to Compton, California.

Military career

United States Army Air Corps
On April 5, 1940, Davis joined the United States Army Air Corps.  He attended Primary Flight Training School in Glendale, California training on a Stearman PT-13.  In spite of his early dreams of being an aviator he encountered problems early in training.  During an engine failure scenario the instructor disliked his choices and wanted to "wash him out".  The chief instructor, however, decided to give him a second chance and began personally instructing him.  He progressed and attended Basic Flight Training at Randolph Field.

Later, during Advanced Flight Training at Kelly Field, Texas, Davis was intent on piloting multi-engine aircraft - specifically B-17s.  His flight instructor, however, told him, "No Davis you're a fighter pilot and that's where you want to be".

Davis graduated with the Flying School Class of '40 G and commissioned as second lieutenant November 15, 1940. He elected to join a group to deliver P-36s to Wheeler Army Airfield, Hawaii in February 1941 aboard the USS Enterprise (CV-6).  Having only 17 hours of flight experience and no carrier experience and while 100 miles from shore Davis was the second plane on the flight deck (immediately behind the commander) to take off the deck of the Enterprise to Wheeler Field.

Nickname: Cyclone
While stationed at Wheeler Field, Oahu, Hawaii the pilots would engage in mock dogfights. One of Davis' signature maneuvers was a tight, climbing spiral with a hammerhead that would put him on the pursuers tail. Other pilots began referring to the maneuver as "the cyclone" and eventually referred to Davis as Cyclone Davis.  Davis embraced the nickname and used it throughout the remainder of his life almost to the exclusion of his first name.  Throughout World War II whenever Davis commanded a fighter group it was known as Cyclone's Flying Circus.

One of "Cyclone"'s peers, Gabby Gabreski who could beat the other pilots and even the commander (and later became one of the leading aces of WW II) could not beat "Cyclone" and later wrote of him: "he was in a class by himself."

World War II

35th Fighter Squadron
Davis took command of the 35th Fighter Squadron, a Bell P-39 Airacobra unit, on 7 March 1943. In the summer of 1943 Davis was able to get his squadron reequipped with the superior Curtiss P-40N Warhawk.

8th Fighter Group
Davis assumed command of the 8th Fighter Group January 18, 1944.  In early March 1944 he began converting the P-40s of the 35th and 36th Fighter Squadrons to P-38s with twin engines and longer range to match what was then being flown by the 80th Fighter Squadron.  Davis was recalled to the States at the end of June 1944 but returned in late May 1945 to resume command through December of that year.

Bendix Trophy
Davis competed in the 1951 Bendix Trophy Transcontinental Air Race – jet class. He flew an F-84E from Muroc Field to Detroit, Michigan. Notwithstanding an in-flight failure resulting in cockpit depressurization, Davis succeeded at finishing second behind Colonel Keith K. Compton

Military ranks
Davis' rank promotions:

Military awards
Davis' military decorations and awards include:

Retirement
Emmett Smith Davis retired from the Air force in 1962 and moved to Palos Verdes, California where he worked for Hughes Aircraft Company. In 1972 he and his family moved to Westlake Village, California and finally in 2005 to Highland, Utah.

Legacy
In 2016, he was inducted in the Utah Aviation Hall of Fame.

References

Notes

Bibliography

External links

Articles
 My-West: Larger Than Life – Cyclone Davis (June 19, 2011)
 KSL: Utah Pearl Harbor survivors share their stories (December 7, 2011)
 The Salt Lake Tribune: Emmett 'Cyclone' Davis, Utahn who flew from Pearl Harbor through Korean War, dies at 96 (November 4, 2015)
 Deseret News Obituaries: Colonel Emmett Smith "Cyclone" Davis (November 6, 2015)
 WWII flying ace Emmett 'Cyclone' Davis was a man movies are made for (December 2, 2015)
 Pearl Harbor was in smoke, and Utah pilot was alone in the sky (December 7, 2012)
 The University of Utah Veterans Day Commemoration 2005: EMMETT "CYCLONE" DAVIS (2005)

Interviews
 Air & Space: A Fighter Pilot at Pearl Harbor (interview May 2015, published December 2015)
 KUED: Utah World War II Stories: Emmett "Cyclone" Davis (February 1, 2006)

Miscellaneous
 Utah Aviation Hall of Fame (May 2016)

1918 births
2015 deaths
American World War II flying aces
Recipients of the Silver Star
Recipients of the Legion of Merit
Recipients of the Distinguished Flying Cross (United States)
Recipients of the Air Medal
United States Army Air Forces pilots of World War II
United States Air Force colonels
People from Roosevelt, Utah
People from Duchesne, Utah
People from Palos Verdes, California
People from Westlake Village, California
People from Highland, Utah
United States Air Force personnel of the Korean War
American Korean War pilots
Military personnel from California